Serpentoplasma is a genus of parasitic alveolates belonging the phylum Apicomplexa. The genus was described in 1962 by Pienaar.

The species in this genus infect snakes.

Morphology

The trophozoites are small and resemble a drop of oil within the erythrocyte.

References

Aconoidasida
Apicomplexa genera